"I Will Get Your Kiss" is a song written by Japanese singer-songwriter Akinori Nakagawa as his debut single. It was released on August 1, 2010 by Tokuma Japan. It was the theme song of the Japanese TV drama Maria.

Track listing

References

External links
Official Discography 
JBook data 

Akinori Nakagawa songs
2001 singles
Japanese television drama theme songs
Songs written by Akinori Nakagawa
2001 songs